Vera Pap (born Veronika Pap 27 January 1956 – 9 April 2015) was a Hungarian actress. She appeared in more than fifty films from 1960 to 2015.

Selected filmography

References

External links 

1956 births
2015 deaths
Hungarian film actresses